White Lake is a medium-sized lake of Ontario, Canada. It may be accessed via Highway 417 from Ottawa or Renfrew Country Road 511 from Perth. The town of White Lake lies on the northern shore of the lake.

The northern and western shores of White Lake mark the upper limit of the Champlain Sea which flooded the Ottawa Valley at the end of the last ice age.

The lake is marked in Canada by National Resources Canada with the CGNDB Unique Identifier: FDDES.

History
Before European settlement the lake was known as Wa-ba-lac by the local natives. In the Johnston Royal atlas (dated 1860) the lake was shown as Wabak or White Lake. The lake name is believed to be derived from the white marl deposits covering large portions of the lake substrate. White Lake was created in 1845 when a dam on Waba Creek was constructed resulting in the water levels increasing in three previously small, interconnected waterbodies. The dam was rebuilt in 1948 and in 1969, was purchased by the Ontario Ministry of Natural Resources and reconstructed again.

In the 1970s summer water levels were stabilized for the benefit of boaters and shoreline property owners. There has been concern over the presence of algal bloom which has become more prevalent as shorelines are developed and local human presence increases.

Ecology
Prior to 1930 White Lake supported a northern pike fishery. With intensive stocking a walleye fishery developed during the period between 1930 and the mid 1960s. Since that time, largemouth bass and northern pike have been the most sought after game fish with walleye being seen only periodically in the anglers catch. Sunfish are also commonplace in White Lake.

The lake is regionally significant for the presence of the White Lake Fen, which is a rare wetland type in Lanark County and considered to be a Provincially Significant Wetland and a Special Place.

See also
 List of lakes in Ontario

References

External links
 The Fishery of White Lake
 Anecdotal History of White Lake
 White Lake Community Website
 National Resources Canada
 AMIK Cottage on White Lake, Ontario
 Area map
 White Lake Preservation Project
 White Lake Property Owners Association
 Statement of Conservation Interest

Lakes of Renfrew County